Kill the Wolf is the fourth studio album from English comedian and musician Matt Berry. It was released in July 2013 under Acid Jazz Records.

Track listing

References

2013 albums
Matt Berry albums
Acid Jazz Records albums